The coat of arms of Lubawa in the Warmian-Masurian Voivodeship, Poland, depicts a bishop of Chełmno or Culm, generally identified as the first bishop, Christian of Oliva (who according to the 1216 bull by Pope Innocent III baptised the local duke of the Prussians, Surwabuno), with his right hand raised in benediction. He stands between a lime tree and a fir tree.

Sources
 Andrzej Plewako, Józef Wanag, 1994: Herbarz miast polskich. Arkady
 Marian Gumowski, 1960: Najstarsze pieczęcie miast polskich XIII i XIV wieku. Towarzystwa Naukowego w Toruniu

See also
 Polish heraldry

Lubawa
Lubawa
Lubawa
Lubawa
Lubawa